Simone Mazzocchi (born 17 August 1998) is an Italian football player who plays as forward for  club Südtirol on loan from Atalanta.

Club career

Atalanta 
Born in Milan, raised in a small neighborhood club (G. S. Villa), Mazzocchi was a youth exponent of Atalanta where he played 54 matches and scored 16 goal for their U-19 team.

Loan to Siracusa 
On 24 July 2017, Mazzocchi was signed by Serie C side Siracusa on a season-long loan deal. One weeks later, on 30 July, he made his professional debut in a 3–1 home win over Renate in the first round of Coppa Italia, he played the entire match. One month kater, on 26 August, Mazzocchi made his Serie C debut as a starter in a 1–0 away defeat against Trapani, he was replaced by Paolo Grillo in the 79th minute. Mazzocchi ended his season-long loan to Siracusa with 25 appearances, including 11 of them as a starter, and 1 assist, but he never played any entire match in the championship.

Loan to Südtirol 
On 17 July 2018, Mazzocchi was loaned to Serie C club Südtirol on a season-long loan deal. On 29 July he made his debut for Südtirol in a 2–1 home win over Albalonga in the first round of Coppa Italia, he was replaced by Gianluca Turchetta in the 58th minute. On 17 September he made his Serie C debut for Südtirol as a substitute replacing Gianluca Turchetta in the 56th minute of a 1–0 home win over Teramo. On 30 September he played his first match as a starter and he scored his first professional goal in the 42nd minute of a 3–2 away defeat against Virtus Verona. On 2 February 2019, Mazzocchi scored twice in a 4–2 away win over AlbinoLeffe. Mazzocchi ended his loan with 37 appearances and 4 goals.

Südtirol 
On 1 July 2019, after the loan, Mazzocchi joined to Serie C club Südtirol on an undisclosed fee and a 3-year contract, however Atalanta had a buy-back clause after the second season. On 4 August he made his seasonal debut as a substitute replacing Niccolò Romero in the 84th minute and he scored his first goal of the season five minutes later in a 4–2 home win over Città di Fasano in the first round of Coppa Italia, and two weeks later, on 18 August, he played his first entire match for the club, a 3–1 away defeat against Udinese in the third round. One week later, Mazzocchi made his league debut and he scored his first goal in the championship in the 33rd minute of a 2–1 away win over Vis Pesaro, he was replaced by Niccolò Romero in the 84th minute.

Loan to Reggiana 
On 11 September 2020, Mazzocchi joined newly promoted Serie B club Reggiana on a season-long loan. Two weeks later, on 27 September, Mazzzocchi made his debut for the club as a starter and he scored his first goal for Reggiana in the 7th minute of a 2–2 home draw against Pisa, he was replaced by Nicolò Cambiaghi after 78 minues. One week later, on 3 October, he scored his second consecutive goal in the 43rd minute of a 2–0 away win over Virtus Entella. He became a regular starter early in the season. Two more weeks later, on 17 October, he played his first entire match for Reggiana, a 1–0 home defeat against ChievoVerona. Mazzocchi ended his season-long loan to Reggiana with 29 appearances, 7 goals and 1 assist.

Atalanta
On 14 July 2021, Atalanta exercised their buy-back option.

Loan to Ternana 
On the same day, the club loaned him to newly promoted Serie B club Ternana for the 2020–21 season on a season-long loan deal.

Loan return to Südtirol
On 7 July 2022, Mazzocchi returned on a new loan to Südtirol.

International career 
Mazzocchi rappresented Italy at U-17, U-18, U-19 and U-20 level. On 27 August 2014, Mazzocchi made his U-17 debut in a 0–0 home draw against Portugal U-17, he played the entire match. On 31 August 2014 he scored his first goal at U-17 level as a substitute in the 78th minute of a 4–3 away defeat against England U-17. Mazzocchi played 5 matches in the 2015 UEFA European Under-17 Championship qualification and he played 7 matches and scored 1 goal in the 2015 UEFA European Under-17 Championship. On 12 August 2015, Mazzocchi made his U-18 debut as a substitute replacing Marco Tumminello in the 57th minute of a 0–0 home draw against Bulgaria U-18. On 16 September he scored twice in a 3–2 away defeat against Czech Republic U-18. On 14 December 2016 he made his U-19 debut as a substitute replacing Andrea Pinamonti in the 56th minute of a 0–0 home draw against Serbia U-19. On 5 September 2017, Mazzocchi made his U-20 debut as a substitute replacing Federico Bonazzoli in the 69th minute of a 6–1 win over Poland U-20.

Career statistics

Club

References

1998 births
Footballers from Milan
Living people
Italian footballers
Italy youth international footballers
F.C. Südtirol players
A.C. Reggiana 1919 players
Ternana Calcio players
Serie B players
Serie C players
Association football forwards